Grace is the major-label debut album by American gospel singer Tasha Cobbs, released February 5, 2013 on EMI Gospel. Cobbs won the Grammy Award for Best Gospel/Contemporary Christian Music Performance for the single, "Break Every Chain", at the 56th Grammy Awards. The album reached No. 1 on the Billboard Gospel Albums chart and No. 61 on the Billboard 200. As of 2016, nearly 200,000 copies have been sold in the United States.

Critical reception

David Jeffries from AllMusic stated "Tasha Cobbs aims to re-create the live worship experience on her major-label debut".

Track listing

Charts

Certifications

References

2013 debut albums
Tasha Cobbs albums